Deep or The Deep may refer to:

Places

United States
 Deep Creek (Appomattox River tributary), Virginia
 Deep Creek (Great Salt Lake), Idaho and Utah
 Deep Creek (Mahantango Creek tributary), Pennsylvania
 Deep Creek (Mojave River tributary), California
 Deep Creek (Pine Creek tributary), Pennsylvania
 Deep Creek (Soque River tributary), Georgia
 Deep Creek (Texas), a tributary of the Colorado River
 Deep Creek (Washington), a tributary of the Spokane River
 Deep River (Indiana), a tributary of the Little Calumet River 
 Deep River (Iowa), a minor tributary of the English River
 Deep River (North Carolina)
 Deep River (Washington), a minor tributary of the Columbia River
 Deep Voll Brook, New Jersey, also known as Deep Brook

Elsewhere
 Deep Creek (Bahamas)
 Deep Creek (Melbourne, Victoria), Australia, a tributary of the Maribyrnong River
 Deep River (Western Australia)

People 
 Deep (given name)
 Deep (rapper), Punjabi rapper from Houston, Texas
 Ravi Deep (born 1954), Indian theatre and television director, writer and actor

Arts and entertainment

Films
 The Deep (unfinished film), a 1970 unfinished film directed by Orson Welles
 The Deep (1977 film), based on the novel by Peter Benchley, starring Robert Shaw, Jacqueline Bisset and Nick Nolte
 The Deep (2012 film), an Icelandic film
 Deep (2005 film)
 Deep (2014 film)
 Deep (2017 film)
 Deep (2021 film), a Thai mystery film

Literature
 The Deep (Crowley novel), a 1975 short novel by John Crowley
 The Deep (Dunmore novel), a 2007 children's novel by Helen Dunmore
 "The Deep" (short story), a 1952 science fiction story by Isaac Asimov
 The Deep (novella), a 2019 fantasy story by Rivers Solomon with 3 others
 The Deep, a 1976 novel by Peter Benchley
 The Deep, a 2015 horror novel by Craig Davidson writing as Nick Cutter
 The Deep, a 1961 detective novel by Mickey Spillane
 The Deep: Here Be Dragons, graphic novels which spawned an animated series
 The Deep (Katsu novel), a 2020 horror novel by Alma Katsu

Music

Groups
 The Deep (band), a short-lived band formed during the mid-1960s

Albums
 Deep (Junior Mance album), 1980
 Deep (Peter Murphy album), 1989
 Deep (Silent Running album), 1989
 Deep (Niacin album), 2000
 Deep – Teenagers from Outer Space, a 1997 album by Balzac (band)

Songs
 "Deep" (East 17 song), 1993
 "Deep" (Pearl Jam song), 1991
 "Deep" (Collide song), 1997
 "Deep" (Nine Inch Nails song), 2001
 "Deep", a song by Blackstreet on Level II (Blackstreet album)
 "Deep", a song by Nickelback on The State 
 "Deep", a song by The Spooky Men's Chorale, 2009
 "The Deep", a song by Red Fang on Only Ghosts

Television
 The Deep (TV serial), a 2010 British television drama serial broadcast on BBC One
 The Deep (TV series), a 2015 animated series from Australia and Canada, based on the graphic novels of Tom Taylor and James Brouwer
 Siren (TV series), a 2018–2020 American TV series, titled The Deep as a TV pilot, that aired on Freeform
 "The Deep" (CSI: NY episode), a 2007 episode of the television series CSI: NY

Other uses in arts and entertainment
 The Deep (painting), a 1953 work by Jackson Pollock
 The Deep, an imaginary virtual reality universe in Sergei Lukyanenko's science fiction novels
 The Deep, a character in The Boys media

Other uses
 Deep (mixed martial arts), a Japanese mixed martial arts promotion and sanctioning organisation
 Deep Foods, an American family-owned and operated manufacturer of Indian foods
 Department of Econometrics and Political Economy (Département d'économétrie et d'économie politique, DEEP), of HEC Lausanne in Switzerland
 The Deep (aquarium), a large underwater aquarium in Hull, England
 Tehom, a Biblical term translated as "deep" in Genesis 1:2

See also
 
 Deeper (disambiguation)
 Depth (disambiguation)